Nyambadao is a village in the commune of Bandrele on Mayotte.

Populated places in Mayotte